Parramos is a town, with a population of 11,970 (2018 census), and a municipality in the Chimaltenango department of Guatemala.

References 

Municipalities of the Chimaltenango Department